Konstantina Kouneva (born 28 September 1964), also known as Kostadinka Kuneva, is a Bulgarian immigrant in Greece, trade unionist and secretary of the Greek Trade Union of Cleaners and Housekeepers. She was elected as an MEP in the 2014 European Parliament elections.

Attack and reactions
Kouneva was working as a cleaner for the IKOMET company (providing services to ISAP, among other clients, through outsourcing). On the night of 23 December 2008, and while on her way home from work (Kouneva had repeatedly requested a shift in the morning hours, but was always denied), she was attacked by unknown assailants with sulfuric acid (vitriol), leaving her face horribly disfigured, and resulting in the loss of sight in one of her eyes. Kouneva was also reportedly forced to swallow a portion of the acid, something which completely destroyed her esophagus and heavily damaged other internal organs. This event sparked protests and clashes with the Greek police during the 2008 civil unrest in Greece.

The protests, which included banners reading "Konstandinka, you're not alone", continued at least until 22 January 2009 and numbered 3,000 people, with tear gas being used by the MAT police forces.

The attack was described as the most severe assault on a trade unionist in Greece in 50 years.

Education
Kouneva graduated from the St. Cyril and St. Methodius University of Veliko Tarnovo with a degree in History.

Politics
She was elected to the European Parliament as a candidate of the left-wing SYRIZA party in the European Parliament election held on 25 May 2014.

References

External links
 

1964 births
Living people
Acid attack victims
Bulgarian expatriates in Greece
Greek trade unionists
MEPs for Greece 2014–2019
21st-century women MEPs for Greece
Syriza MEPs
Janitors
People from Silistra
Syndicalists
Violence against women in Europe